Kevin Maguire may refer to:

 Kevin Maguire (artist) (born 1960), American comic book penciller
 Kevin Maguire (figure skater) (born 1980), Canadian pair skater
 Kevin Maguire (Gaelic footballer)
 Kevin Maguire (ice hockey) (born 1963), former professional ice hockey forward and referee
 Kevin Maguire (journalist) (born 1961), British political journalist